The Muslim Quarter ( Ḥāraṫ al-Muslimīn;   Ha-Rovah ha-Muslemi) is one of the four sectors of the ancient, walled Old City of Jerusalem. The quarter is the largest and most populous of the four quarters and extends from the Lions' Gate in the east, along the northern wall of the Temple Mount in the south, to the Damascus Gate—Western Wall route in the west. The Via Dolorosa starts in this quarter.

The population of the Muslim Quarter is 22,000.

History
The Muslim quarter had a mixed population of Jews, Muslims and Christians until the 1929 Palestine riots. Some 60 Jewish families now live in the Muslim Quarter. Yeshivat Ateret Yerushalayim is the largest yeshiva.

In 2007, the Israeli government started funding the construction of The Flowers Gate development plan, the first Jewish settlement inside the Muslim Quarter since 1967. It would include 20 apartments and a synagogue. According to the Palestinian Academic Society for the Study of International Affairs, Israel has installed up to 500 closed-circuit cameras in the three non-Jewish quarters (Muslim, Christian and Armenian).

Landmarks
Jewish landmarks include the Kotel Katan or Little Western Wall, and the Western Wall Tunnels, which run below the neighborhood along the Western Wall. There are many Roman and Crusader remains in the quarter.  The first seven Stations of the Cross on Via Dolorosa (Way of the Cross) are located there.

See also
 Ateret Cohanim
 Bab Al Huta
 Birket Israel
 Church of the Flagellation
 Ohel Yitzchak Synagogue
 Jerusalem in Islam
 Pool of Bethesda
 Religious significance of the Syrian region
 St Anne's Church
 Via Dolorosa
 Zedekiah's Cave

References

External links
HD Virtual Tour of the Muslim Quarter - December 2007

Neighbourhoods of Jerusalem
Arab neighborhoods in Jerusalem
Quarters (urban subdivision)
 
Old City (Jerusalem)